Symphony No. 39 is a symphony in G minor (Hoboken 1/39) by Franz Joseph Haydn in 1765, at the age of 33 under the beneficence of Prince Nikolaus Esterházy. It is the earliest of Haydn's minor key symphonies associated with his Sturm und Drang period works (such as the Symphony No. 45).

Movements
It is written for an orchestra consisting of two oboes, four horns (two in B alto and two in G), and strings (violins divided into two, violas, cellos and double basses). There are four movements:

Allegro assai, 
Andante,  in E major
Menuet & Trio, 
Finale: Allegro di molto, 

The opening movement features a nervously exciting main theme interrupted by frequent pauses.  Felix Diergarten has specifically analysed the pauses in the first movement in the symphony, with respect to symphonic form of the time.  Both the first and second theme groups begin with the same two bars of melodic material.

In contrast to the Sturm und Drang of the opening movement, A. P. Brown describes the Andante as "one of Haydn's most galant slow movements, with its small meter signature, sixteenth triplets, slides, weak resolutions, echoes, and generally thin texture".

The minor mode returns for the Menuet which is contrasted by a bright major-mode Trio which features high notes for the first horn.

The frenetic Sturm und Drang finale brings the symphony to an energetic conclusion.

Notes

References
Robbins Landon, H. C. (1963) Joseph Haydn:  Critical Edition of the Complete Symphonies, Universal Edition, Vienna

Symphony 039
Compositions in G minor